Joseph Hovlik (August 16, 1884 in Austria-Hungary – November 3, 1951 in Oxford Junction, Iowa), was a Major League Baseball player who played pitcher from  to . He would play for the Chicago White Sox and Washington Senators.

External links

1884 births
1951 deaths
Major League Baseball pitchers
Major League Baseball players from Austria-Hungary
Chicago White Sox players
Washington Senators (1901–1960) players
Clinton Infants players
Peoria Distillers players
Milwaukee Brewers (minor league) players
Kansas City Blues (baseball) players